Arsenate reductase (cytochrome c) (arsenite oxidase) is an enzyme with systematic name arsenite:cytochrome c oxidoreductase. This enzyme catalyses the following chemical reaction

 arsenite + H2O + 2 oxidized cytochrome c  arsenate + 2 reduced cytochrome c + 2 H+

Arsenate reductase is a molybdoprotein isolated from alpha-proteobacteria that contains iron-sulfur clusters.

References

External links 
 

EC 1.20.2